The Aspen Brook is a  tributary of the Big Thompson River in Larimer County, Colorado.  The stream's source is near Wind River Pass. It flows north to a confluence with the Big Thompson in Rocky Mountain National Park.

See also
 List of rivers of Colorado

References

Rivers of Colorado
Rocky Mountain National Park
Rivers of Larimer County, Colorado
Tributaries of the Platte River